Willow Lake, in Macon County, Georgia near Marshallville, Georgia, is a historic house built in 1875–80. It was listed on the National Register of Historic Places in 1980.

It was here where Samuel H. Rumph developed the Elberta peach.  It was his home until 1904 when he moved into town.

The Willow Lake Nursery had over 65,000 trees.

References

National Register of Historic Places in Macon County, Georgia
Greek Revival architecture in Georgia (U.S. state)
Houses completed in 1875
1875 establishments in Georgia (U.S. state)